Avaria may refer to:

 Avar Khanate of the Caucasian Avars in the Caucasus
 Avar Khaganate of the medieval Pannonian Avars in the Pannonian Basin
 Avar March
 Avaria (moth), a genus of moths

See also 
 Avar (disambiguation)